The 2017 International Tennis Tournament of Cortina was a professional tennis tournament played on clay courts. It was the 4th edition of the tournament which was part of the 2017 ATP Challenger Tour. It took place in Cortina d'Ampezzo, Italy between 24 and 30 July 2017.

Singles main-draw entrants

Seeds

 1 Rankings are as of 17 July 2017.

Other entrants
The following players received wildcards into the singles main draw:
  Riccardo Balzerani
  Jacopo Berrettini
  Dragoș Dima
  Andrea Vavassori

The following player received entry into the singles main draw as a special exempt:
  Matteo Berrettini

The following player received entry into the singles main draw as an alternate:
  Viktor Galović

The following players received entry from the qualifying draw:
  Pedro Cachín
  Roberto Marcora
  Juan Pablo Paz
  Miljan Zekić

Champions

Singles

  Roberto Carballés Baena def.  Gerald Melzer 6–1, 6–0.

Doubles

  Guido Andreozzi /  Gerald Melzer def.  Steven de Waard /  Ben McLachlan 6–2, 7–6(7–4).

References

2017 ATP Challenger Tour
International Tennis Tournament of Cortina
2017 in Italian tennis